The Mysterious Mr. Valentine is a 1946 American film noir crime film directed by Philip Ford starring William Henry, Linda Stirling and Virginia Christine.

Plot
A young girl gets a flat tire, and ends up with her car being stolen. Later, her car is involved in an accident which results in a man's death. The gangsters who stole the car plant the body in her car to make it look like she was at fault.

Cast
 William Henry as Steve Morgan
 Linda Stirling as Janet Spencer
 Virginia Christine as Lola Carson
 Thomas E. Jackson as Police Lt. Milo Jones (credited as Thomas Jackson)
 Barbara Woodell as Rita Armstrong
 Kenne Duncan as Sam Priestly (credited as Ken Duncan)
 Virginia Brissac as Martha, the Housekeeper
 Lyle Latell as Peter Musso, Henchman
 Ernie Adams as Frank Gary, Henchman
 Tristram Coffin as John Armstrong
 Arthur Space as County Coroner
 Robert Bice as Doctor

Critical reception
Film critic Hal Erickson wrote that the film was "a neat-and-tidy thriller from the Republic B-picture mills."

References

External links
 
 
 
 
 The Mysterious Mr. Valentine at Film Noir of the Week by Wheeler Winston Dixon
 

1946 films
1946 crime drama films
American crime drama films
American black-and-white films
Film noir
Republic Pictures films
1940s English-language films
1940s American films